Puckaster is a hamlet on the Isle of Wight, England. Puckaster is on the southern coast of the Isle of Wight, south of Niton , between St. Catherine's Point and Binnel.

History
Puckaster has  historical significance. Some have tried to identify Puckaster Cove with the Roman "Portus Castrensis" although others dispute this. Also, on 1 July 1675 King Charles II was forced ashore in Puckaster
Cove in bad weather and heavy seas, as recorded in the Niton Church Register:

Vice-Admiral Sir Thomas Hopsonn as an orphan lived in Niton. Seeing the fleet passing offshore he literally ran away to sea, down Puckaster Lane and into a rowing boat, later distinguishing himself, especially at the Battle of Vigo Bay in 1702 and returning to become a local Member of Parliament. He is mentioned by Samuel Smiles in Self Help.
The coastline around Puckaster is quite treacherous, leading to the creation of St. Catherine's Oratory on St. Catherine's Down and eventually other lighthouses in the area. Among the other shipwrecks near Puckaster was that of the West Indianman "Three Sisters". The Three Sisters went aground at Puckaster in January 1799. Three of the crew were drowned in this accident.

Geography
Puckaster is part of the Undercliff, a large coastal landslide complex along the southern coastline of the Isle of Wight, and as such is subject to coastal erosion concerns. It is also the home of some rare bees and other unique insects. Its unique climate allows the growth of some plants that are found nowhere else in the British Islands; this was even the subject of a publication by philosopher and economist John Stuart Mill. To this end, Puckaster Farm was purchased in an effort to preserve this area.

Puckaster Cove sits on the coastline beneath the hamlet, immediately east of Reeth Bay and west of Binnel Bay. It is a small remote cove that is now largely inaccessible and dangerous due to landslides. It has a narrow and rocky shoreline with a small shingle beach. The remains of several wooden structures and cleared sand channels can be seen offshore, these originate from the small fishing community that once existed at the cove, which was subsequently destroyed by landslides during the 20th century. As at Reeth Bay the cove is backed by in-situ cliffs of Lower Greensand, with superficial mudflows and landslide debris from the Gault Clay (known locally as 'Blue Slipper') and Upper Greensand.

Puckaster has inspired several renowned paintings and drawings. For example, British painter Edward William Cooke (1811–1880) made a watercolor of Puckaster Cove in 1831. The Brigham Young University Museum of Art owns an anonymous drawn plan of a Puckaster dwelling and a watercolor of a Puckaster cottage. Mrs. W. Bartlett and W. Willis made a well known etching of Puckaster Cove that was published in "Barber's Picturesque Illustrations of the Isle of Wight" in 1845. The Tate Collection includes a drawing by artist Sir David Wilkie (1785–1841) titled, "Sir Willoughby Gordon and his Daughter Julia, Cooking on a Griddle at Puckaster, near Niton, Isle of Wight  1822". Painters L. J. Wood and Richard Henry Nibbs (1816–1893) have also produced notable paintings of Puckaster.

Famous residents
Yacht designer and builder Uffa Fox lived in Puckaster. Prince Philip stayed in Puckaster as a young man when he was learning to sail.

Mythology
Author Cassandra Eason identifies Puckaster as a place which is frequented by fairies in her book, "A Complete Guide to Fairies & Magical Beings".

Flag

Puckaster has its own flag which references the Buddle Inn and the tin trade with Cornwall, the history of smuggling on its coast, St Catherine's Lighthouse, the local landmark and three anchors which reference the Isle of Wight and safe anchorage at the Isle of Wight.

References

External links
Puckaster Cove photo, Steve Gascoigne, Available Light Photography

Villages on the Isle of Wight